Victoria is a commune located in the southern part of Brăila County, Muntenia, Romania. It is composed of two villages, Mihai Bravu and Victoria.

The commune is situated in the middle of the Bărăgan Plain, on the border with Ialomița County.

References

Communes in Brăila County
Localities in Muntenia